The 1950–51 Egyptian Premier League started on September 1950. Al Ahly were crowned champions for the third time in the club's history.

League table

References

External links 
 All Egyptian Competitions Info
 League info

5
1950–51 in African association football leagues
1950–51 in Egyptian football